Vikings: Valhalla, or simply Valhalla, is a historical drama streaming television series created by Jeb Stuart for Netflix. It is a sequel to History's Vikings, filmed in County Wicklow, Ireland. Set one hundred years after the events of Vikings, the series chronicles the beginning of the end of the Viking Age, marked by the Battle of Stamford Bridge in 1066. The 8-episode first season premiered on February 25, 2022. With a 24-episode order announced in November 2019, the series was officially renewed for a second and third season in March 2022. The second season premiered on January 12, 2023. The third season is set to premiere in 2024.

Premise
Vikings: Valhalla is set more than 100 years after the events of Vikings; in England, tensions between the descendants of the Vikings (Norse or "Danes") and native English reach a bloody breaking point. The Norse also clash amongst themselves over conflicting Christian and pagan beliefs. 

The beginning of the series depicts the St. Brice's Day massacre in 1002 and intends to conclude with the end of the Viking Age, marked by the Battle of Stamford Bridge in 1066.

Cast and characters

Main

 Sam Corlett as Leif Erikson
 Frida Gustavsson as Freydís Eiríksdóttir
 Leo Suter as Harald Sigurdsson
 Bradley Freegard as King Canute
 Jóhannes Haukur Jóhannesson as Jarl Olaf Haraldsson (seasons 1–2)
 Caroline Henderson as Jarl Estrid Haakon (season 1)
 Laura Berlin as Queen Emma
 David Oakes as Earl Godwin

Recurring

Guest

Episodes

Season 1 (2022)

Season 2 (2023)

Production

Development
On January 4, 2019, alongside the announcement that Vikings would end after its sixth season, it was announced that Michael Hirst and MGM Television were developing a spin-off series with writer Jeb Stuart. On November 19, 2019, it was announced that this series, titled Vikings: Valhalla, would take place a century after the end of the original series and would be released on Netflix. The 24-episode series was made by MGM Television, and filmed primarily in Ireland, working from the same Ashford Studios in County Wicklow. The series focuses "on the adventures of Leif Erikson, Freydis, Harald Hardrada and the Norman king William the Conqueror".

On March 9, 2022, the series was officially renewed for a second and third season. On November 21, 2022, it was announced that the second season would premiere on January 12, 2023.The third season is set to premiere in 2024.

Casting
On November 28, 2020, it was reported by one news outlet that they believe Danish actor Kenneth Christensen, Icelandic actor Jóhannes Haukur Jóhannesson, Swedish actress Frida Gustavsson, and David Oakes had been cast in the series. Frida Gustavsson was later revealed to have been cast as Freydís Eiríksdóttir, while Jóhannes Haukur had been cast as Olaf "the Holy" through erroneously earlier reports stated that he had been cast as Harald Hardrada, a part given to Leo Suter. Caroline Henderson was cast as the current ruler of Kattegat Jarl Haakon, a character based on Canute the Great's vassal ruler Haakon Ericsson. Bradley Freegard was cast as Canute the Great and Pollyanna McIntosh as his wife Ælfgifu. Sam Corlett was cast as Leif Eriksson.

Other actors include German actress Yvonne Mai has been cast as Merin, and Bill Murphy has been cast as Ödger. Irish actors Alan Devine has been cast as the Ealdorman of Kent and Gavin O'Connor will portray the Ealdorman of East Anglia. Devine and Bosco Hogan have previously appeared in Vikings as Ealdorman Eadric in the second season and Abbot of Lindisfarne in the fifth season, respectively. Jack Mullarkey has been cast as a character named Toke. Joakim Nätterqvist will portray Birkir, and Ethan Dillon was cast as Vestian.

New cast members for the second season include: Bradley James as Harekr, Hayat Kamille as Mariam, Marcin Dorocinski as Grand Prince Yaroslav the Wise, Sofya Lebedeva as Eleana and Nikolai Kinski as Emperor Romanos

Writers
Showrunner Jeb Stuart's writing team includes Vanessa Alexander, Declan Croghan and Eoin McNamee. The first episode was directed by Niels Arden Oplev.

Filming
Vikings: Valhalla started filming in early October 2020 at Ashford Studios, Wicklow, where previous Vikings was filmed. Shooting was suspended due to a number of positive COVID-19 tests, only to resume after a few days. At the time a number of cast and crew were reported to have tested positive; however, it emerged that the production had received a number of false positive tests. Filming was planned to resume at Ashford Studios in Ireland beginning in August 2021.

Production on the second season wrapped in November 2021.  Directors include the BAFTA-winning Danish director Niels Arden Oplev, Steve Saint Leger who directed several episodes of Vikings and Hannah Quinn.

Production on the third season began in May 2022 and wrapped in October 2022.

Music
The musical score for the first season was composed by the Trevor Morris. Amalie Bruun of Myrkur provided the kulning vocals for the opening credits. The series also made heavy use of music from the album The Word as Power by Lustmord, which was also featured in Season 6 of Vikings.

Reception

Critical response
The review aggregator website Rotten Tomatoes reported a 90% approval rating for the first season, based on 29 reviews, with an average rating of 7.0/10. The website's critical consensus reads, "Reveling in the glory of straightforward adventure storytelling, Valhalla is a bloody-good dramatization of Leif Eriksson's conquests." Metacritic gave it a weighted average score of 70 out of 100 based on reviews from 13 critics, indicating "generally favorable reviews".

The second season has a 100% approval rating on Rotten Tomatoes, based on 7 reviews, with an average rating of 7.7/10.

Accolades 
The series was nominated for Outstanding Supporting Visual Effects in a Photoreal Episode at the 21st Visual Effects Society Awards.

References

External links
 
 

American adventure television series
American sequel television series
Canadian adventure television series
Costume drama television series
Cultural depictions of Leif Erikson
English-language Netflix original programming
Serial drama television series
Television series by Corus Entertainment
Television series by MGM Television
Television series set in the 11th century
Television series set in the Viking Age
Television shows filmed in the Republic of Ireland
2020s American drama television series
2022 American television series debuts
2020s Canadian drama television series
2022 Canadian television series debuts
Works based on Gesta Danorum
Works based on sagas